This is a list of the operas written by the German composer and pianist Eugen d'Albert (1864–1932).

List

References
Sources
Forbes, Elizabeth (1992), 'Albert, Eugen d' ' in The New Grove Dictionary of Opera, ed. Stanley Sadie (London) 

Footnotes

 
Lists of operas by composer
Lists of compositions by composer